The Women's 3 m synchro springboard competition of the 2016 European Aquatics Championships was held on 15 May 2016.

Results
The final was held at 17:13.

References

Diving